Robin John Batterham AO FREng FAA FTSE (born 3 April 1941) is an Australian scientist specialising in chemical engineering. He was the Chief Scientist of Australia from 1999 to 2006.

Born in the Melbourne suburb of Brighton, Batterham graduated from the University of Melbourne in 1965 with a degree in chemical engineering, and received a PhD from the same institution in 1969. He received a scholarship from the Commonwealth Scientific and Industrial Research Organisation (CSIRO) to undertake postgraduate studies at the central research laboratories of ICI in the United Kingdom. Batterham returned to Australia in 1970, and took up the position of chief scientist of the CSIRO's Division of Mineral Engineering, and was later promoted to division chief.

In 1999, he was appointed Chief Scientist of Australia, a role which he undertook simultaneously to acting as chief technologist for the multinational mining company Rio Tinto. Supporters of renewable energy technologies claimed that Batterham's employment by a mining company made his advice to the Prime Minister on climate change and geosequestration questionable, although Batterham assured his critics that his advice and work as Chief Scientist was neutral and not affected by his Rio Tinto position. In 2004, concern was expressed over Dr. Batterham's dual roles, and a Senate committee found that there was a conflict of interest between the two, recommending that the Chief Scientist position be made full-time. In May 2005, Batterham stepped down as Chief Scientist and took on a full-time position at Rio Tinto.

From May 2004 to May 2005, Batterham was President of the Institution of Chemical Engineers.

Batterham was elected a member of the National Academy of Engineering in 2004 for the modeling of iron ore systems and team leadership in the development of innovative industrial metallurgical processes. He was appointed an International Fellow of the Royal Academy of Engineering in 2004. He was also appointed a Fellow (FTSE) of the Australian Academy of Technological Sciences and Engineering (ATSE) in 1988, and served as its President 2007–2012. in 2014 the Batterham Medal was established in his honour by ATSE as an early career award in the field of engineering.

Batterham is the assistant organist at Scots' Church, Melbourne. He has given numerous organ recitals, and has released several CDs.

References

1941 births
Living people
People educated at Brighton Grammar School
University of Melbourne alumni
Chief Scientists of Australia
Australian chemical engineers
Australian mining engineers
Imperial Chemical Industries people
Officers of the Order of Australia
Recipients of the Centenary Medal
Australian classical organists
Male classical organists
Fellows of the Australian Academy of Technological Sciences and Engineering
Fellows of the Australian Academy of Science
Foreign members of the Chinese Academy of Engineering
21st-century Australian public servants
21st-century Australian engineers
20th-century Australian engineers
21st-century organists
21st-century Australian male musicians
21st-century Australian musicians
People from Brighton, Victoria
Scientists from Melbourne